Lepidodiscus is an extinct genus of diatoms.

References

External links 

 Lepidodiscus at WoRMS

†
Prehistoric SAR supergroup genera